Football Club Olympique de Saint-Jean-de-la-Ruelle is a French association football club founded in 1968. They are based in the town of Saint-Jean-de-la-Ruelle, and their home stadium is the Stade des Trois Fontaines. As of the 2009–10 season, the club plays in the Division d'Honneur de Centre, the sixth tier of French football.

References

External links
FCO Saint-Jean-de-la-Ruelle official website 

Football clubs in France
Association football clubs established in 1968
1968 establishments in France
Sport in Loiret
Football clubs in Centre-Val de Loire